The Man Who Dared is a 1946 American film noir crime film directed by John Sturges, which serves as the first film he directed.

Plot
It tells the story of a reporter who concocts a false case so as to get himself convicted for first degree murder. He does this to prove that a death sentence could be erroneously issued based on circumstantial and flawed evidence and that the death penalty should be abolished.

Cast
 Leslie Brooks as Lorna Claibourne
 George Macready as Donald Wayne
 Forrest Tucker as Larry James
 Charles D. Brown as Dist. Atty. Darrell Tyson
 Warren Mills as Felix
 Richard Hale as Reginald Fogg
 Charles Evans as Judge
 Trevor Bardette as Police Sgt. Arthur Landis
 William Newell as Police Sgt. Clay

Movies with similar themes
 Beyond a Reasonable Doubt (1956)
Bidugade (1973)
Abhilasha (1983)
The Life of David Gale (2003)

References

External links 
 
 

1946 films
1946 drama films
American drama films
Columbia Pictures films
Films about capital punishment
Films about journalists
Films directed by John Sturges
Films scored by George Duning
American black-and-white films
1946 directorial debut films
1940s English-language films
1940s American films